The 1983 Argentina rugby union tour of Australia was a series of seven matches played by the Argentina national rugby union team in Australia in July and August 1983.

Argentina played two test v Australia, winning one of them. It was the first time they beat a Wallabie team in Australian territory.

Touring team 

Props
 Pablo Devoto (C.A. San Isidro - Buenos Aires)
 Fernando Morel (C.A. San Isidro - Buenos Aires)
 Serafín Dengra (San Martin - Buenos Aires)
 Enrique Rodríguez (Tala - Córdoba)
Hooker
 Andrés Courreges (C.A. San Isidro - Buenos Aires)
 Juan Baeck (Pueyrredón - Buenos Aires)
Locks
 Eliseo Branca (C.A. San Isidro - Buenos Aires)
 Gustavo Milano (Jockey Club Rosario - Rosario)
 Gabriel Travaglini (C.A. San Isidro - Buenos Aires)
Flanker and Number 8
 Tomas Petersen (San Isidro Club - Buenos Aires)
 Ernesto Ure (Club Universitario B.A. - Buenos Aires)
 Carlos Neyra (Alumni - Buenos Aires)
 Buenaventura Minguenz (Sporting Club - Mar del Plata)
 Ricardo De Vedia (San Isidro Club - Buenos Aires)

Scrum Halves
 Alfredo Soares Cache (San Isidro Club - Buenos Aires)
 Marcelo Larrubia (C.A. San Isidro - Buenos Aires)
Fly Half
 Hugo Porta (Banco Nacion - Buenos Aires)
Center
 Rafael Madero (San Isidro Club - Buenos Aires)
 Marcelo Loffreda (San Isidro Club - Buenos Aires)
 Bernardo Miguens (Club Universitario B.A. - Buenos Aires)
 Guillermo Varone (C.A. San Isidro - Buenos Aires)
Wings
 Marcelo Campo (Pueyrredón - Buenos Aires)
 José Maria Palma (Pucará - Buenos Aires)
 Fernando González Moran (Pucará - Buenos Aires)
Full-backs
 Daniel Baetti (Atlético Rosario - Buenos Aires)
 Martín Sansot (Pueyrredón - Buenos Aires)

Match details 
Complete list of matches played by Argentina in Australia:

 New South Wales :_ G.Ella, G.Da Vanzo, B.Papworth, M.Hawker,  M.Martin, M.Ella (capt.), D.Voughan, R.Reynolds, S.Poidevin, D.Codey, P.Clemente, S.Williams, D.Curran, L.Walker (B.Malouf),  O.Hall. Argentina: M.Sansot, J.Palma, M.Loffreda, R.Madero, M.Campo, Porta (capt.), A.Soares Gache, B.Minguez, G.Travaglini, T.Petersen, G.Milano, E.Branca, E.Rodriguez, A.Courreges, S.Dengra.

 A.C.T. : Campese (capt.), Thomas, Girvan, McGrath, Morton, Vest, Berry, O'Neill, Galvin, Utilelea, Donnellan, Kasrrzak, Takiari, Cowie, Didier  Argentina: D.Baetti, J.Palma, G.Varone, R.Madero, M.Campo, Porta (capt.), M.Larrubia, R.De Vedia, C.Neyra, E.Ure, G.Milano, E.Branca, P.Devoto, A.Courregee, F.Morel

 Queensland: Martin, Moon, Slack, Hanley, Grigg, Lynagh, Parker, Shaw (capt.), Hall, Roche, McLean, Hillhouse, Pileki, Rosa, Meadows  Argentina: M.Sansot (Bernardo Miguens), J.Palma, M.Loffreda , R.Madero, M.Campo, Porta (capt.), A.Soares Gache, G.Travaglini, B. Minguez, T.Petersen, G.Milano, E.Branca, E.Rodriguez, A.Courreges, S.Dengra.

 New South Wales Country: P.Gell, D.Vignes, J.Grant, M.Scanlon, M.Kinlayson, B.Everingham, B.Turnar, S.Morgan, B.Abram, D.Carter, J.Boland, M.Smith, J.Coolican, P.Palmer (capt.), R.Mercer. Argentina:  B.Miguens, J.Palma, M.Loffreda, G.Varone, M.Campo, R.Madero, A.Soares Gache (capt.), R.De Vedía, B.Mínguez, E.Ure, G.Milano, G.Travaglini, P.Devoto, J.Baeck, S.Dengra

First test 

Queensland Country: Smee (capt.), Dillon, Wholer, Finch, Hood, Duncan, Iwikau, Astken, McLeod, R.Burnees, Filday, McCowan, Shaelds, Cox, K.Burnees. Argentina':  D.Baetti, M.Sansot, M.Loffreda, G.Varone, F.González Morán, Porta (capt.), M.Larrubia, R.De Vedia, C.Neyra, G.Travaglini, G.Milano, E.Branca, E.Rodriguez, J.Baeck, P.Devoto

Second test

References

1983
1983
1983 in Australian rugby union
1983 in Argentine rugby union
History of rugby union matches between Argentina and Australia